Julen Roselló García, a two-year-old Andalusian boy, fell  into a narrow shaft near Totalán in the province of Málaga, on January 13, 2019. To carry out a rescue, it was necessary to drill a parallel conduit of a greater diameter, in an operation in which more than 300 people intervened, plus numerous heavy machinery. The operation received international media coverage. After several setbacks during drilling, on 26 January 2019 at 1:25 am, Roselló's body was found between two layers of earth.

Disappearance
Roselló disappeared on January 13, 2019 playing while his parents, José and Vicky, were having a picnic on their cousin's boyfriend's property in Totalán, Spain. Vicki was in the midst of calling the burger restaurant where she worked to inform them she wouldn't be going in that day. Jose was preparing food and collecting wood when Roselló ran off. He fell into a 107-metre-deep shaft with a diameter of 25 to 30 cm. The shaft had been drilled in December 2018 by an entrepreneur searching for ground water, without the permission of the authorities. It was not secured afterwards, though the owner said he had covered the hole with rocks. Jose heard him cry and when he reached down not realizing the depth of the hole, sand fell and he no longer heard him cry. Hikers close by heard their screams and quickly called for help.

At 1:57 pm on January 13, through a call to the emergency center in Málaga, a woman warned that a young child had fallen through a small hole,  in diameter. The ground of the well Roselló fell in is very unstable and experts determined that any operation had to be done with great care to avoid landslides. A device and a plan to rescue him was set in motion, moving a machine, drilling piles of 75 tons, together with other heavy machinery, to the site to reduce the terrain to excavate a parallel shaft and, once the level where he was believed to be, to excavate a horizontal tunnel by miners of the Central Salvage Brigade Mining of Asturias, specialists in underground rescues. It was necessary to build a special capsule so that the miners could move to the place.

Attempted rescue
Initial work and preparation related to the rescue were carried out without any inconvenience. However, later a series of setbacks arose that extended the task, much to the anguish of relatives and rescuers.

This was discovered when a camera was lowered into the shaft. Construction of the vertical shaft took several days due to the rocky nature of the earth. On January 24, 2019, the vertical shaft was completed and rescuers started excavating the horizontal gallery.

Explosives were used as a last resort as rescuers could not break through the rocks using conventional tools. First, the excavation of the parallel tunnel was slower than had been thought at the beginning, since the terrain turned out to be harder than expected and the use of the machines had to be managed in order not to damage them. With the tunnel already built, the second difficulty arose with the jacketing.

The pipes that were planned to be introduced inside the well, to ensure this, did not fit, due to discontinuities in the walls of the gallery. This circumstance forced the rescue teams to drill the tunnel again to widen it. The Spanish authorities received offers from dozens of international companies to collaborate in the search, including the Swedish geolocation firm Stockholm Precision Tools AB, which participated in the rescue of the 33 miners trapped for 69 days in the north of Chile in 2010.

The rescue operation was carried out in a few days, an engineering task that, usually, would be extended for months. The dimensions of the work were reflected in some figures offered by the government delegate in Andalusia, when he assured that more than 40,000 tons of dirt had been moved and a height equivalent to that of the Giralda in Seville was being excavated. The inventor of the rescue capsule of the Chilean miners offered his help in this rescue.

Recovery
On January 26 at 1:25 am local time, rescuers located Roselló's body in the well. Autopsy revealed that he suffered a "severe head trauma" from the 71-metre fall and presumably died instantly.

Search and rescue team
The Mining Rescue Brigade, which traveled from Asturias, made available to the rescue eight of its best elite miners. The elite brigade has received several awards and distinctions for their work, such as the Gold Medal for Merit in Work (1972), the Silver Medal of the Principality of Asturias (1990) and Silver Medal of the Red Cross (2005).

Uncertainties
One of the biggest questions about the rescue in the well of Totalán is the origin of the ground plug that hindered access to Roselló. Experts understand that this ground plug comes from the sides of the well and was dragged by his body during his fall, so it could be a landslide. Another theory is that, as it is an abandoned well, it is normal for the lateral walls to fall. Specialists say that it is understandable that the humidity, due to the effects of the rain, will wear away the walls and lose consistency, causing the sand or the surrounding earth to detach inside the pit.

Nobody could explain, of the 300 people who worked in Roselló's rescue, how the plug of dirt was so compact. A series of questions arose that the experts tried to answer. They say that it is unlikely that the plug was formed by the dirt dragged by his fall, given that the type of perforation is supposed to be clean, with no remains of sand or dirt. Another question is how quickly the plug has been compacted, assuring the experts that if it were dry sand, as it seemed to be, it would have taken weeks to form, and in this case it did in the first 24 hours.

Legal consequences

The High Court of Justice of Andalusia decided to open a lawsuit after a report of the Civil Guard, investigating the circumstances which led to the accident.

Independent of the rescue in the interior of the well, the Civil Guard began an investigation to reconstruct the facts, as happens in any other disappearance. A court in Málaga opened proceedings in the courtroom known as the Julen Case. The Ninth Court of Instruction of Málaga opened proceedings to know the exact circumstances in which Roselló fell on the well. The proceedings were initiated after an attestation made by the Civil Guard after taking the parents' declaration of the minor, the owner of the land and the person who dug the well in mid-December of the previous year.

Media treatment
The accident and subsequent recovery of Roselló received extensive media coverage by Spanish and foreign media. Referring to coverage on television networks, the event was addressed in both news programs and morning and afternoon magazines that recorded audience records. El programa de Ana Rosa de Telecinco expanded its regular schedule and made special programs. Also Sálvame, another Spanish program, covered the events of the final hours of the rescue.

Media coverage generated various criticisms from other journalists who described it as a "media circus" and in social networks, accusing various media outlets of encouraging morbidity and sensationalism. The Andalusian Audiovisual Council announced that it would study the media coverage of the case due to a possible violation of the rights of the minor's relatives.

Hoax denial
On 24 January, the Civil Guard, through its official Twitter account, was forced to deny a hoax that went viral and circulated through social networks, especially WhatsApp, claiming that there was an alternative theory about what happened that the Civil Guard would be investigating and that it had forbidden journalists to bring it to light.

Timeline
 On Sunday, 13 January 2019, Julen Roselló García, 2, was spending the day with his family when, around 2pm, he fell into a well located on a private farm. A group of pedestrians heard his parents' screams and called the emergency team immediately.
 On 14 January, a camera goes down to 73 meters deep and locates a bag of sweets and a plastic cup inside the well, which belong to Roselló. Rescue teams can not get down any more by running into a hard dirt plug, assuming he is under it.
The preparatory works begin.
 On 16 January, it is confirmed by DNA tests that hair from Roselló has been found inside the well. It transpires that the works for the well did not have permission from the Council of Andalucía and his father, Jose, appears before the media to say that he and his wife, Vicki, keep hope alive.
 On 17 January, the rescue teams decided to suspend the construction of a horizontal tunnel due to landslides and hardness of the terrain.
 On 18 January, the heavy machinery drilled to open a vertical tunnel parallel to the well and they run into a slate rock mass at 18 meters depth, which again complicates the rescue work.
 On 23 January, the rescue team reduces the diameter of the pipe intended for vertical drilling.
 On 25 January, the miners advance in the final search in the well. The rescue team excavates almost  of the  that they had to drill to reach the bottom and have to make up to four microblasts to break hard rock (quartzite).
 On 26 January at 1:25 am, the rescue teams accessed the point of the well where Roselló was sought and located his body between two layers of earth. A judicial commission was activated.

See also
 Kathy Fiscus (1945–1949), American child who fell into a well and died
 Alfredo Rampi (1975–1981; nicknamed Alfredino), Italian child who fell into a well and died
 Jessica McClure (born 1986; nicknamed Baby Jessica), American child who fell into a well in 1987 and was rescued
 Rayan Aourram (born 2016 or 2017; died 2022), Moroccan child who fell into a well and died

References 

2019 in Spain
Accidental deaths from falls
Accidental deaths in Spain
Deaths by person in Spain
History of the province of Málaga
Cases of people who fell into a well